New Zealand raspberry budmoth may refer to:

Carposina rubophaga
 A misnaming of Carposina adreptella

Animal common name disambiguation pages